The 1923–24 Football League season was Birmingham Football Club's 28th in the Football League and their 11th in the First Division. They finished in 14th position in the 22-team division. They also competed in the 1923–24 FA Cup, entering at the first round proper and losing in that round to Huddersfield Town.

Twenty-five players made at least one appearance in nationally organised first-team competition, and there were eleven different goalscorers. Goalkeeper Dan Tremelling was ever-present over the 43-match season; among outfield players, half-back Percy Barton appeared in 40 matches. Joe Bradford was leading scorer for the third successive year, with 24 goals, all of which came in the league.

Billy Beer, who as a player made 250 appearances for the club in the 1900s, succeeded Frank Richards as secretary-manager before the start of this season.

Football League First Division

League table (part)

FA Cup

Appearances and goals

Players with name struck through and marked  left the club during the playing season.

See also
Birmingham City F.C. seasons

References
General
 Matthews, Tony (1995). Birmingham City: A Complete Record. Breedon Books (Derby). .
 Matthews, Tony (2010). Birmingham City: The Complete Record. DB Publishing (Derby). .
 Source for match dates and results: "Birmingham City 1923–1924: Results". Statto Organisation. Retrieved 18 May 2012.
 Source for lineups, appearances, goalscorers and attendances: Matthews (2010), Complete Record, pp. 288–89. Note that many attendance figures are estimated.
 Source for kit: "Birmingham City". Historical Kits. Dave Moor. Retrieved 12 May 2021.

Specific

Birmingham City F.C. seasons
Birmingham